Veronica Grace Burton (born July 12, 2000) is an American professional basketball player for the Dallas Wings of the Women's National Basketball Association (WNBA). She played college basketball for the Northwestern Wildcats. She also represented the United States at the 2021 FIBA Women's AmeriCup and won a gold medal.

College career
During the 2018–19 season, in her freshman year, she started 31 games and ranked first in the Big Ten in steals (81), second in assist-to-turnover ratio (2.4), and tied for sixteenth in assists per game (3.6). She also led the team in assists (113) and steals (81). During the 2019–20 season, in her sophomore year, she ranked first in the Big Ten in steals (100), second in assist-to-turnover ratio (2.4), fourth in assists (152) and free throw percentage (.793). She also led the team in assists, steals, and free throw percentage. Following an outstanding season, she was named to the Big Ten All-Defensive Team and named Big Ten Defensive Player of the Year.

During the 2020–21 season, in her junior year, she started 24 of 25 games and led the team in points (16.2), assists (4.9) and steals (3.8). Her 3.84 steals per game also led the NCAA. Following an outstanding season, she was named to the Big Ten All-Defensive Team, first-team All-Big Ten and named Big Ten Defensive Player of the Year for the second consecutive year.

On October 21, 2021, Burton was named captain for the 2021–22 season. During her senior year, she averaged 18 points, six assists, five rebounds and four steals per game. Before the NCAA Tournament, she led the nation in total steals and ranked second in steals per game. She also ranked in the top five nationally and led the Big Ten in assist-to-turnover ratio, and ranked sixth nationally in assists per game. Her 117 steals were the third most in a season in Wildcat history and tied for the seventh most in a season in Big Ten history. Following an outstanding season, she was named an unanimous selection to the Big Ten All-Defensive Team and first-team All-Big Ten. She was named the Big Ten Defensive Player of the Year for the third consecutive year, joining Tanisha Wright as the only three-time winner. She was also named the WBCA Defensive Player of the Year and a semifinalist for the Naismith Defensive Player of the Year Award. She was also named a third-team All-American by the Associated Press, and an honorable mention by USBWA. She became the first player in program history to be named to an AP All-America team.

On March 25, 2022, Burton renounced her extra year of eligibility due to the COVID-19 pandemic and declared for the 2022 WNBA draft. She finished her career second-all time in program history in steals with 394, and third all-time in Big Ten history. She also finished third in program history in career assists with 575.

WNBA

Dallas Wings
On April 11, 2022, Burton was drafted in the first round, 7th overall, by the Dallas Wings in the 2022 WNBA draft.

WNBA career statistics

Regular season

|-
| align="left" | 2022
| align="left" | Dallas
| 36 || 6 || 15.2 || .329 || .279 || 1.000 || 1.5 || 1.9 || 0.9 || 0.3 || 1.0 || 2.6
|-
| align="left" | Career
| align="left" | 1 year, 1 team
| 36 || 6 || 15.2 || .329 || .279 || 1.000 || 1.5 || 1.9 || 0.9 || 0.3 || 1.0 || 2.6

Playoffs

|-
| align="left" | 2022
| align="left" | Dallas
| 3 || 3 || 28.0 || .400 || .300 || .800 || 2.7 || 3.3 || 2.0 || 0.3 || 2.0 || 6.3
|-
| align="left" | Career
| align="left" | 1 year, 1 team
| 3 || 3 || 28.0 || .400 || .300 || .800 || 2.7 || 3.3 || 2.0 || 0.3 || 2.0 || 6.3

National team career
On June 6, 2021, Burton was named to team USA for the 2021 FIBA Women's AmeriCup. During the tournament, she averaged 4.8 points, 3.3 rebounds and 4.0 assists per game, to help lead USA to a gold medal.

Personal life
Veronica was born to Steve and Ginni Burton. Her father played quarterback at Northwestern, and is currently a television sports reporter in Boston, while her mother was an All-American and Big Ten Champion in swimming for the Wildcats. Her sisters, Kendall and Kayla also played college basketball, while her brother, Austin, was a quarterback at Purdue. Her grandfather, Ron Burton, played football for the Boston Patriots and is a College Football Hall of Famer.

References

External links
 Northwestern Wildcats bio

2000 births
Living people
All-American college women's basketball players
American women's basketball players
Basketball players from Massachusetts
Northwestern Wildcats women's basketball players
People from Newton, Massachusetts
Point guards
United States women's national basketball team players
Dallas Wings draft picks
Dallas Wings players